Eucosma messingiana is a species of moth of the family Tortricidae. It is found in China (Hebei, Inner Mongolia), Mongolia, Russia and Europe, where it has been recorded from Germany, the Czech Republic, Denmark, Hungary, Poland, the Baltic region, Sweden and Finland. The habitat consists of sandy areas.

The wingspan is 18–28 mm. Adults are on wing from August to September in one generation per year.

The larvae feed on Artemisia campestris. Larvae can be found from September to May.

References

Moths described in 1837
Eucosmini
Taxa named by Josef Emanuel Fischer von Röslerstamm